Wellsee is a lake in Schleswig-Holstein, Germany. At an elevation of 29 m, its surface area is 0.25 km².

Lakes of Schleswig-Holstein